We Need to Talk is the debut studio album by American songwriter and singer Tayla Parx, released on April 5, 2019. The album was preceded by the singles "Me vs. Us", "Slow Dancing" and "I Want You".

Background
After co-writing many songs for artists such as Christina Aguilera, Mariah Carey, BTS. She also co-wrote "Love Lies" by Khalid and Normani, "High Hopes" by Panic! at the Disco and Ariana Grande's number 1 singles "Thank U, Next" and "7 Rings". Parx began writing her album in mid 2018 to early 2019. When interviewed about the album and her own label she said, " lot of labels started to realize that I was writing their artists’ songs and helping their artists come up with an identity for themselves. The last few albums I’ve worked on, I’ve done at least half the album".

Composition
The album was mentioned to have a "common theme of R&B".

Singles
"Me vs. Us" was released as the lead single on September 14, 2020. One month later on October 19, 2020, she released "Slow Dancing" as the second single. The third single of the album, "I Want You", was released along with its music video on March 9, 2019.

Critical reception
Pitchfork mentioned that the best parts are when they "arrive in the moments when Tayla Parx's charisma starts to shine through". But also mentioning that "Tayla encounters the same pitfalls that have held back many songwriters who attempt to break through as performers". Kyle Denis from Black Boy Bullentin mentioned that "We Need to Talk, Tayla floats between sugary pop melodies and disarming verses". Complex Praised, Parx for her work on many other songs and also said "We Need to Talk showcases Parx taking center stage with her talents". Cool Accidents said "We Need To Talk, drops today and yeah, we need to talk about how good it is. It's full of the honest songwriting, pop groove and sparkly production", While also mentioning her work on Ariana Grande's 2018 album Sweetener. Billboard mentioned "Parx's debut album is her chance to show and prove. With classical music and acting training growing up, Parx's skillset undeniably developed into a perfect storm for making music".

Track listing
Credits adapted from iTunes and Tidal.

References

2019 debut albums
Pop albums by American artists
Atlantic Records albums
Albums produced by Frequency (record producer)